Right Livelihood can refer to:
A Buddhist virtue articulated as part of the Noble Eightfold Path
The Right Livelihood Award, an international award established in 1980 by German-Swedish philanthropist Jakob von Uexkull.